Pandoraea faecigallinarum is a Gram-negative, aerobic, non-spore-forming bacterium of the genus Pandoraea, isolated from chicken feces.

References

External links
Type strain of Pandoraea faecigallinarum at BacDive -  the Bacterial Diversity Metadatabase

Burkholderiaceae